The Houston Astros are a professional baseball franchise based in Houston, Texas. They are a member of the American League (AL) West in Major League Baseball (MLB). The team joined MLB in 1962 as an expansion team named the Houston Colt .45s and changed their name to the Houston Astros in 1965. The team won their first NL Championship in 2005. Having first played in Colt Stadium (1962–1964), and later in The Astrodome, now known as the Reliant Astrodome (1965–1999), the Astros have played their home games at Minute Maid Park, which was first named The Ballpark at Union Station, since 2000. The franchise is owned by Jim Crane. The current manager is Dusty Baker.

There have been 23 managers for the Astros franchise. The team's first manager was Harry Craft, who managed for three seasons. Bill Virdon is the franchise's all-time leader for the most regular-season games managed (1066) and the most regular-season game wins (544). A. J. Hinch holds the record for most all-time playoff games managed (50) while he and Baker each have 28 postseason wins (most in team history), with Baker leading in playoff winning percentage (.586). Salty Parker is the Astros' all-time leader for the highest regular-season winning percentage, as he has only managed one game, which he won. Of the managers who have managed a minimum of 162 games (one season), Baker has the highest regular-season winning percentage with .599. Leo Durocher is the only Astros manager to have been elected into the Baseball Hall of Fame. Garner, Hinch, and Baker are the only managers to have won league pennants with the franchise, Garner winning one in the National League in 2005, Hinch winning two in the American League in 2017 and 2019, and Baker winning two in 2021 and 2022. Larry Dierker is the only Astros manager to have had his uniform number retired by the Astros, with his uniform number 49 retired by the Astros in 2002. Dierker is also the sixth manager in MLB history to win a division championship in his first season for the Astros in 1997. Lanier and Dierker are the only managers to have won a Manager of the Year Award with the Astros, winning it in 1986 and 1998 respectively. Grady Hatton, Lanier, Dierker, and Cooper have spent their entire managing careers with the Astros.

Key

Managers
Note: Statistics are correct as of November 5, 2022.

Notes 
 A running total of the number of managers of the Colt .45s/Astros. Thus, any manager who has two or more separate terms as a manager is only counted once.
 Each year is linked to an article about that particular MLB season.

References 
General
 
 
 

Specific

 
Lists of Major League Baseball managers
Managers